Eastern Canada (also the Eastern provinces or the East) is generally considered to be the region of Canada south of the Hudson Bay/Strait and east of Manitoba, consisting of the following provinces (from east to west): Newfoundland and Labrador, Nova Scotia, Prince Edward Island, New Brunswick, Quebec and Ontario.

Ontario and Quebec, Canada's two largest provinces, define Central Canada; while the other provinces constitute Atlantic Canada.  New Brunswick, Nova Scotia and Prince Edward Island are also known as the Maritime provinces.

Capitals
Ottawa, Canada's capital, is located in Eastern Canada, within the province of Ontario.

The capitals of the provinces are in the list below:
 Newfoundland and Labrador - St. John's
 Nova Scotia - Halifax
 Prince Edward Island - Charlottetown
 New Brunswick - Fredericton
 Quebec - Quebec City
 Ontario - Toronto

Definitions

The Canadian Press defines Eastern Canada as everything east of and including Thunder Bay, Ontario.

Population
The total population of this region is about 23,946,177 in 2016, or about 70% of Canada's population. Most of the population resides in Ontario and Quebec. The region contains 3 of Canada's 5 largest metropolitan areas, Toronto being the fourth largest municipality in North America.

Largest metropolitan areas
Toronto, Ontario - 6,254,191
Montreal, Quebec - 4,098,927
Ottawa-Gatineau, Ontario-Quebec - 1,568,381
Quebec City, Quebec - 807,200
Hamilton, Ontario - 536 917
London, Ontario - 474 786
St. Catharines-Niagara, Ontario - 447,888
Kitchener, Ontario - 441 380
Halifax, Nova Scotia - 403,131
Windsor, Ontario - 329,144
Sherbrooke, Quebec - 212,105
St. John's, Newfoundland and Labrador - 205,955

The population of each province in 2016, from greatest to least is here:

Ontario - 13,448,494
Quebec - 8,164,361
Nova Scotia - 923,598
New Brunswick - 747,101 
Newfoundland and Labrador - 519,716
Prince Edward Island - 142,907

Politics
Eastern Canada is represented by 213 Members of Parliament out of the 336 (106 in Ontario, 75 in Quebec and 32 in the Atlantic Provinces) and 78 senators out of 105.

See also
 Eastern United States
 List of regions of Canada

References

External links
 
 

 
Regions of Canada